Beker Fabian or the Waufarer Poet (namesake of the famous poet Gustavo Adolfo Bécquer), in Peru Beker Simón Fabián De Lao, is a Peruvian poet and writer and naturalized Italian. He is active in Peru, where he promotes diffusion of literature among young people, with literary events and poetry contests in the schools of the Andean and Amazon areas – where the mass media (including internet) still arrive with difficulty – and also in Italy, where he strives to highlight in his work and in social and literary events, the importance of dialogue and mutual exchange between different cultures, and he supports the integration of migrants and people with disabilities in the social structure.

Biography 

Beker Simon Fabian was born in Margos, in the district of Huanuco, Peru, on July 31 of 1963. He spent his infancy on the Andes with his grandparents and brothers, speaking the local Quechuan language and learning Spanish at the primary school. At the age of 14 he became independent from his numerous family members, who had already moved to Lima, working to complete his studies and beginning to travel through many provinces of Perú. To this period pertain his first poems. Achieving his diploma in pedagogy and education, he dedicated himself to teaching in the area of Amazonian border, valorizing local culture and innovating the outdated school programs, for eight years. Because of conflicts with Alberto Fujimori's regime, he left teaching and began touring all over South America, giving seminaries of oratory and taking part in international congresses of the Quechuan language.

In 1998 he arrived in Europe and settled in Italy, where he began to dedicate himself to his first and true passion for poetry, deepening his studies and learning the Italian and English languages. There, in 1999, he became an integral part of the Peruvian community in the city of Ancona and was elected as vice-president for a period of two years. In this city, he met the woman of his life, Alice Bellesi, and they tied the knot; this experience deeply marked his life and his work, and 15 years later it would become the essence of a book. Together with his yearned muse he traveled all over Europe: Italy, Spain, France, Belgium, Netherlands, Switzerland, Ireland, England, Wales, Scotland – and he continues traveling. These journeys are reflected and transfigured in his poetical work.

In 2011 his first book, a collection of poems entitled Eternal Wayfarer (Eterno Viandante), was published: he undertook a tour of presentations which touched many Italian cities and participated with this work at the international literary event Babele Festival, in the town of Montecosaro, filmed by local television and presented online. In 2012 he undertook a tour of presentations of this book in Peru too, involving municipalities, libraries and schools.

In 2013 Elixir of Love (Elisir d’amore), a book in poetry and poetical prose co-authored with his wife, was published, so he undertook a tour of presentations in Italy. In 2014 this tour continued in Peru.

In 2015 he recorded a no-profit audio version of this book for the Italian Union of Blind and Partially Sighted People and the Institute of Rehabilitation Research and Training (UIC and IRIFOR) of Macerata.

Honours and awards 

 In 2005 he won the special prize Cara pace ti scrivo 2005 with the poem Il potere dell’amore.
 In 2006 he obtained the certificate of appointment as World Poets Consul (Cónsul de Poetas del mundo en Macerata, Italia) in the province of Macerata, Italy, from the association Movimiento Poetas del Mundo.
 In 2008 he was awarded with the Mention of Honour of the section Estero of the international prize The Rainbow of life (L’Arcobaleno della Vita, with the poem In the shadow of peace (All’ombra della pace).
 In December 2011 he received, for his work Eterno Viandante, the official congratulations from the current President of the Republic of Peru, Ollanta Humala.
 In 2013 he obtained the Diploma of Recognition from the Ministry of Culture for participating with his work Eterno Viandante in the Cultural Fridays in Huanuco, Peru.

Works 

 Dear peace I write (Cara pace ti scrivo) – poetry and prose from the literary contest created to spread a culture of peace – curated by Domenico Monti, published in 2005
 Eternal Wayfarer (Eterno Viandante) – collection of poems in Spanish with translation in Italian, published in 2011
 Instants of Infinity – Anthology of Poetry and Visual Arts – Special Edition for the World Poetry Movement (Istanti d’Infinito 3 – Antologia di Arti Figurative e Poesia – Edizione Speciale WPM – Movimento Mondiale della Poesia) - published in 2012 with Associazione Culturale Leopardian Community Coro a più voci, with contributions from several authors
 Elixir of Love (Elisir d’amore) - book in poetry and poetic prose in Italian and Spanish published in 2013, co-authors Beker Fabian & Alice Bellesi
 Elixir of Love Audiobook – non-profit online MP3 version of the book produced in 2015 for Macerata Sections of UIC and IRIFOR

Bibliography 

 
 
 
 
 Newspaper article Un "Elisir d’amore" in Piazza Brancondi

See also 

 Gustavo Adolfo Bécquer – romantic Spanish poet
 Matsuo Bashō – Japanese traveling master of haiku poetry
 The Road Goes Ever On – walking song cycle by J. R. R. Tolkien
 Wanderer above the Sea of Fog – painting by the German romantic painter Caspar David Friedrich
 L'elisir d'amore – opera by Gaetano Donizetti

Notes

External links 

 Beker Simon Fabian and some of his poems in Spanish, Italian and English, on the website of Movimiento Poetas del mundo
 Video in Italian and Spanish - Beker Simon Fabian participating in Babele Festival with some poems from Eterno Viandante
 Invitation to the presentation of Eterno Viandante on the website of the Consolate of Peru in Rome
 Press Release of the Municipality of Morrovalle
  Reportage about Babele Festival on the website of Macerata Chronicles
 Presentation of Eterno Viandante in the House of the Cultures in Ancona
 Video- Beker Simon Fabian in Italian and in Spanish during the presentation of Eterno Viandante in Huánuco, Peru
 Video- ending of the presentation of Eterno Viandante in Huánuco, Peru
 Presentation of Elisir d'amore in the Municipal Library of Numana
 Presentation of Elisir d'amore in the Zavatti Municipal Library of Civitanova Marche
 Presentation of Elisir d'amore in the Orientation Lounge of the University of Macerata
 Presentation of Elisir d'amore on the website of Republic of Veneto
 Presentation of Elisir d'amore on Frecciole News, the newsletter of Cascina Macondo
 Audio-MP3 version of Elisir d’amore in Italian and Spanish, free download on the website of the Italian Union of Blind and Partially Sighted People – Provincial  Macerata Section.

1963 births
Living people
20th-century Peruvian poets
Italian poets
Peruvian emigrants to Italy
21st-century Peruvian poets
Peruvian male poets
20th-century Italian male writers
21st-century Italian male writers